James Scott Levine (born 1974) is a composer and member of Remote Control Productions. He has won seven BMI awards and seven ASCAP awards. His credits include the films Running with Scissors, Delta Farce, and The Weather Man, and the television shows Nip/Tuck, Glee, The Closer, Rizzoli & Isles, and American Horror Story. He has also provided additional music for films such as Madagascar, Pearl Harbor, and Something's Gotta Give.

Early life
James Levine grew up in Medford, Massachusetts, where he played multiple instruments in various genres. The main instrument he played growing up was the piano, performing at multiple events growing up. At the age of 13 Levine shifted his focus from playing the piano, to learning Jazz, as well as improvisation. Composers that Levine looked up to when he was younger were Mozart, Morricone and James Newton Howard. He is of Jewish heritage.

Levine attended Tufts University, where he was originally a pre-med student.However he switched subject areas, and subsequently in college Levine studied Sociology and Musicology, and got his degree in American Studies.  He graduated from Tufts in 1996.

Career
Levine came to Hollywood in 1997 to begin his career as a composer, leaving behind money and family. He first started off his career by doing intern work around Los Angeles.

James Levine is a composer for shows like American Horror Story, Glee, Nip/Tuck, Royal Pains and The Closer.

The music for American Horror Story is one of his most known works, receiving many awards such as the Best Music in a Series, Best music in a non-series, and has been nominated for outstanding sound mixing for television movies and miniseries two years in a row. Due to the success of his music he has continued to create music for the show. His work on Glee has also won him many awards and he has gone on to keep composing for the show until the final season.

Composing

Awards

References

External links

"Interview: James Levine, Composer of 'American Horror Story,' 'Royal Pains,' and 'Glee'", Movie Mom, at BeliefNet
Composer Interview: James S. Levine at FilmMusicMedia
ASCAP
reddit

1974 births
Living people
Tufts University School of Arts and Sciences alumni